Rose Hall at 1,142 feet,  is the highest settlement in St. Vincent and the Grenadines.  It is located in Saint David Parish on the island of Saint Vincent in Saint Vincent and the Grenadines. It is located to the east of Westwood, south of Rose Bank, just to the north of Spring Village and far west of Byera on the windward coast. It is uniquely positioned for pictures of La Soufriere volcano. St Lucia across the ocean. The mountain range and ships in the Caribbean Sea. It has a rich cultural heritage, organic farms with and it is one area that any plant in the hemisphere grows. It has a strong communal spirit and it hospitality knows no boundaries. It is one, if not the safest stop to visit on the island.

References

Scott, C. R. (ed.) (2005) Insight guide: Caribbean (5th edition). London: Apa Publications.

Populated places in Saint Vincent and the Grenadines